King Edward VII School (KES) is a public English medium high school for boys situated within the city of Johannesburg in South Africa's Gauteng Province, one of the historically significant Milner Schools. 

The school is a public school, with an enrollment of over 1,100 boys from grades 8 to 12 (ages 13 to 18). King Edward VII Preparatory School (KEPS), which is situated adjacent to the High School and shares its grounds, caters to boys from grades R to 7.

History

In 1902, when the Boer War came to an end, there was an urgent need for schools in the Transvaal. The Milner Administration, in search of suitable buildings in which to establish temporary classrooms, found a vacant cigar factory in Johannesburg, on the corner of Gold and Kerk Streets, which was chosen as venue for "The Government High School for Boys", also known as the "Johannesburg High School for Boys". Thus was born a school which ultimately became the King Edward VII School.

It grew so rapidly that, in 1904, it was moved to Barnato Park where it was established in the mansion that originally had been designed for the mining millionaire Barney Barnato, who died at sea in 1897. At its new location, it was referenced as "Johannesburg College" but, within seven years, the premises were deemed inadequate and, in 1911, the school was moved to its present site on the Houghton ridge where new buildings had been impressively-designed and specifically constructed for the school.  The time frame, within less than a year after the founding of the Union of South Africa and the death of Queen Victoria's eldest son and successor, Edward VII, led to the proposal that the institution's name be changed to honour his memory, thus establishing the appellation, King Edward VII School.

Buildings

Over a century old, the school buildings of King Edward retain their impressive appearance and are considered national monuments. These include the school hall, the back facade, the front facade, the lecture theatre and library wing, the memorial wing and the cenotaph in the main quad.

Sports
Sports that are offered in the school are:

 Athletics
 Basketball
 Chess
 Cricket
 Cross country
 Golf
 Hockey
 Rowing
 Rugby
 Soccer 
 Squash
 Swimming
 Table tennis 
 Tennis
 Water polo

Poaching

The school has been involved in numerous rugby poaching scandals resulting in at least two schools (SACS in Cape Town and near neighbours Parktown Boys) cancelling fixtures against the school.

Notable Old Edwardians

Sydney Kentridge, lawyer and judge
Sydney Lipworth, lawyer and businessman
Mark Weinberg
Donald Gordon, businessman and philanthropist
Johann Kriegler
Richard Goldstone Constitutional Court judge
Ronnie Kasrils, cabinet minister
William Kentridge, artist
Bryce Courtenay, novelist ("The Power of One")
Michael McClelland, Professor of Microbiology and Genetics at the University of California, Irvine
Anthony Preston, Naval Historian
Arthur Walker HCG, Bar SAAF Pilot

Sportsmen
Gary Player, golf
Arthur Langton, cricketer
Ali Bacher, cricketer
Kevin McKenzie, cricketer
Neil McKenzie, cricketer
Ray Jennings, cricketer
Hugh Page, cricketer
Adam Bacher, cricketer
Nic Pothas, cricketer
Graeme Smith, cricketer
Joe van Niekerk, rugby player
Bryan Habana, rugby player
Rhys M. Thomas, rugby player (Wales)
Cliff Durandt, soccer player
Vaughn van Jaarsveld, cricketer
Scarra Ntubeni, rugby player
Quinton de Kock, cricketer
Dane Vilas, cricketer
Shaun Keeling, rowing
Stephen Cook (cricketer)
Malcolm Marx, rugby player
Keaton Jennings, cricketer (England)
Stan Schmidt, karate
John Gartly, cricketer
Stuart Hiddleston, cricketer

References

External links
King Edward VII School Family Official Website

Boarding schools in South Africa
Schools in Johannesburg
Educational institutions established in 1902
Boys' schools in South Africa
1902 establishments in South Africa
Edward VII schools